Pescaru is a Romanian-language surname derived from the occupation of fisherman. Notable people with this surname include:

Nicolae Pescaru, Romanian footballer
Florentin Pescaru, Romanian gymnast

Romanian-language surnames
Occupational surnames